The Tennessee House of Representatives is the lower house of the Tennessee General Assembly, the state legislature of the U.S. state of Tennessee.

Constitutional requirements
According to the state constitution of 1870, this body is to consist of 99 members elected for two-year terms. In every even-numbered year, elections for state representative are conducted simultaneously with the elections for U.S. Representative and other offices; the primary election being held on the first Thursday in August.  Seats which become vacant through death or resignation are filled by the county commission (or metropolitan county council) of the home county of the member vacating the seat; if more than a year remains in the term a special election is held for the balance of the term.

Districts
Members are elected from single-member districts. The districts are traditionally numbered consecutively from east to west and north to south across the state; however, in recent redistricting this convention has not always been strictly adhered to, despite a constitutional provision requiring districts to be numbered consecutively.

Districts are required to be reapportioned every ten years following the federal census in order to be of substantially equal population. However, from 1902 until 1962, the General Assembly ignored this provision.  It was estimated that by that point that some districts in the Memphis area had approximately ten times the population of some in rural areas.  In 1962 this issue was taken to court. Despite U.S. courts having traditionally declined to rule on such issues, the US Supreme Court opted to hear this case and ruled that the legislature had to comply with the state constitution, as its failure to do so was in violation of the Equal Protection Clause of the Fourteenth Amendment to the U.S. Constitution (see Baker v. Carr).  Subsequent litigation has further refined the rules regarding this; in the late 1990s a majority-black district in rural West Tennessee was required to be created.

The 1960s redistricting was credited by some observers with creating the first Republican majority in the Tennessee House since Reconstruction in 1968; this situation lasted only until the next election in 1970. 1970 also marked the first election of a Republican governor in a half century and saw both houses of the legislature begin to assert themselves as a counterbalance to executive authority; prior to this time legislators had not had their own staffs or even their own offices and were largely at the mercy of what the governor's staff chose to tell them and in many ways were often something of a "rubber stamp."

Speaker of the House

The Speaker of the House of Representatives is the presiding officer of the House. The Speaker is elected to a two-year term at the beginning of the 1st half of each session of the Tennessee General Assembly. Additionally, the Speaker is second in line for succession to the governorship, after the Speaker of the Senate, in the event of such need. The Speaker appoints members to all committees as well. Even though the Speaker does not have to make committee assignments proportional to the party composition, usually that discretion is used when determining such. Usually, consideration of the abilities, preferences, party representation, and seniority of the members are taken into account. The chairperson, vice chairperson, and secretary of each committee also are chosen by the Speaker and must be given the same considerations in their selection. The Speaker is a voting member of all standing committees of the House, as is the Speaker pro Tempore. The Speaker also serves as co-chairperson of the Joint Legislative Services Committee and must approve, in concurrence with the Speaker of the Senate, the directors of the offices of Legislative Information Services, Legal Services, Legislative Administration, and Legislative Budget Analysis. Additionally, the Speaker is in charge of all facilities, professional and clerical staff, and custodians and security personnel of the House.

The current speaker is Cameron Sexton, who represents Tennessee's 25th district.

Composition of the 113th General Assembly (2022- present)

Officers
Speaker of the House: Cameron Sexton (R)
Speaker Pro Tempore: Pat Marsh (R)
Deputy Speaker: Curtis Johnson (R)

Members as of 2023

House Committees
Committees, subcommittees, and their leadership for the 112th General Assembly are as follows:

Education level among members

Among Republicans, around 30% of all members hold no degree beyond high school completion, less than 20% hold a Master's or other post baccalaureate degree, and less than 10% have a law degree. Among Democrats, of whom there are a substantially lower number, 15% hold no degree beyond high school, around 30% hold a Master's or other post baccalaureate degree, and 25% have a law degree.

Diversity among Representatives 
November 2020 saw the election of first openly LGBT+ people ever to hold seats in Tennessee's state house of representatives, Democrat Torrey Harris and Republican Eddie Mannis. Before November 3, 2020, Tennessee was one of just five states in the nation (others being Alaska, Delaware, Louisiana and Mississippi) to have never elected an out LGBT+ person to its state legislature.

Of its 99 members, twenty-one were women in 2020. Representatives Harold Love and Raumesh Akbari hold leadership roles in the National Black Caucus of State Legislators, in which eight Tennessee state lawmakers are members. Akbari is also a State Director with Women in Government, as is Brenda Gilmore.

Past composition of the House of Representatives

See also
Tennessee Senate

References

External links
Official website

House
State lower houses in the United States